Ahmed Saeed (born 14 May 1980) is a Maldivian footballer nicknamed "Ammaty", who plays as a defender for Victory. He is a member of the Maldives national football team. He is from the island of Feydhoo, Addu Atoll. He was first selected for the under 19 team from Zone 8 (Addu & Fuvahmulah) for a football match to be played with under 19 national team to mark the youth day in 1997. He displayed an outstanding performance and was well noticed. He was immediately selected to the Under 19 national side and New Radiant signed him in the same year. He is known as the best left back born in the country so far.

He was among the key players who helped Maldives to win the first SAFF championship 2008 at Colombo / Male. He was employed with the Maldives Airports Company Ltd.

Since he retired from National and 1st division football, he has been playing football for his island. 2016 has been a busy year for Ahmed Saeed (Ammaty).

Honours

Maldives
 SAFF Championship: 2008

External links 

MACL

1980 births
Living people
Maldivian footballers
Maldives international footballers
New Radiant S.C. players
Victory Sports Club players
Association football midfielders